Hampton is a town in Hampton County, South Carolina, United States. The population was 2,808 at the 2010 census. It is the county seat of Hampton County. The town and the county are named after Wade Hampton III, a Confederate general in the Civil War.

History
Hampton County was created from northwestern portions of Beaufort County in 1878 by the South Carolina General Assembly. In appreciation for helping to end the Reconstruction Era and leading the Democratic Party, the county was named after the sitting governor, Wade Hampton III. Upon creation of the county, the town of Hampton Courthouse was incorporated the following year to serve as the county seat. The U.S. Postal Service would later shorten the name to Hampton. The location was chosen based on the midpoint location of the Port Royal Railroad between Augusta, Georgia, and Port Royal, in hopes to spur economic development. The town was laid out in an orderly grid pattern, with streets running northeast/southwest being named after trees and streets running northwest/southeast being numbered. The central three-block main street which ran between the courthouse block and the rail depot was named Lee Avenue.

Hampton prospered due to its connections with local agricultural fields and became an important depot along the railway. However, the town remained small, though an influx of activity occurred in World War II when a Prisoner-of-War camp was opened near the town. Additional economic development came in the form of industry, with Plywoods-Plastic opening a major facility northwest of town for pulp production. Over time, the company was acquired by Westinghouse and International Paper. IP sold the site to Nevamar, and the facility remained one of the county's largest employers until its closure in late 2014.

In recent years, auto-oriented commercial development was focused on the outskirts of town, leaving the original downtown without much activity. The town of Hampton has attempted to bring back commercial and civic activity to Lee Avenue and has undergone a multi-phased streetscape project, which has rendered some success in luring back businesses to downtown. Hampton County also completed renovations to its historic courthouse in 2012, choosing to remain in downtown Hampton.

The American Legion Hut, Bank of Hampton, Hampton Colored School, Hampton County Courthouse, and Palmetto Theatre are listed on the National Register of Historic Places.

Geography
Hampton is located in north-central Hampton County at  (32.867514, -81.111554). It is bordered to the southeast by the town of Varnville. U.S. Route 278 passes through the center of Hampton as Elm Street; the highway leads northwest  to Fairfax and southeast through Varnville  to Ridgeland. U.S. Route 601 enters Hampton from the south as First Street and leaves to the north on Hoover Street. 601 leads north  to Bamberg and south  to its terminus at US 321 near Tarboro.

Culture
Two months prior to the founding of the town, the Hampton County Guardian began printing, and continues to be the paper of record for Hampton and the remainder of the county. It is one of the oldest and longest-running newspapers in South Carolina.

Since 1939, Hampton has hosted the annual Hampton County Watermelon Festival, held in the third week of June. The weeklong festival features such events as a watermelon judging contest and a watermelon eating contest. The main event of the festival is the parade held on Saturday that runs from Varnville to Hampton. As of 2015, the Watermelon Festival is South Carolina's longest continually running festival.

Demographics

2020 census

As of the 2020 United States census, there were 2,694 people, 1,139 households, and 595 families residing in the town.

2000 census
As of the census of 2000, there were 2,837 people (2,795 in 2004 estimate), 1,178 households, and 775 families residing in the town. The population density was 626.1 people per square mile (241.8/km2). There were 1,339 housing units at an average density of 295.5 per square mile (114.1/km2). The racial makeup of the town was 55.30% White, 42.44% African American, 0.28% Native American, 0.53% Asian, 0.78% from other races, and 0.67% from two or more races. Hispanic or Latino of any race were 0.81% of the population.

There were 1,178 households, out of which 30.5% had children under the age of 18 living with them, 44.7% were married couples living together, 18.2% had a female householder with no husband present, and 34.2% were non-families. 30.9% of all households were made up of individuals, and 14.6% had someone living alone who was 65 years of age or older. The average household size was 2.40 and the average family size was 3.01.

In the town, the population was spread out, with 26.9% under the age of 18, 7.8% from 18 to 24, 26.2% from 25 to 44, 23.2% from 45 to 64, and 16.0% who were 65 years of age or older. The median age was 38 years. For every 100 females, there were 83.9 males. For every 100 females age 18 and over, there were 75.3 males.

The median income for a household in the town was $30,650, and the median income for a family was $40,688. Males had a median income of $31,625 versus $21,250 for females. The per capita income for the town was $17,326. About 15.2% of families and 18.9% of the population were below the poverty line, including 26.4% of those under age 18 and 17.7% of those age 65 or over.

Education
Public education in Hampton is provided by Hampton County School District 1.  Students attend the following schools:
 Ben Hazel Primary School
 Bubba's Virtual Learning
 Brunson Elementary School
 Fennell Elementary School 
 Hampton Elementary School
 North District Middle School
 Varnville Elementary School
 Wade Hampton High School
Patrick Henry Academy, located three miles southwest of downtown Hampton is a local private school that serves Hampton and Hampton County.  The Technical College of the Lowcountry also holds some courses in the county and the Clemson University Extension office offers a variety of courses and programs for local residents and businesses.

Hampton has a public library, a branch of the Allendale Hampton Jasper Regional Library.

References

External links
 Town of Hampton official website
 Hampton County Guardian

Towns in Hampton County, South Carolina
Towns in South Carolina
County seats in South Carolina